The Honours System of Zimbabwe superseded the Rhodesia Honours System in 1980.

See also 
 List of post-nominal letters (Rhodesia)

Post
Zimbabwe
Post-nominal letters